The One Hundred Thirtieth Ohio General Assembly was a meeting of the Ohio state legislature, composed of the Ohio State Senate and the Ohio House of Representatives.  It convened in Columbus, Ohio on January 7, 2013 and adjourned December 30, 2014.  This General Assembly coincided with the last two years of John Kasich's first term as Ohio Governor.  The apportionment of legislative districts was based on the 2010 United States census and 2011 redistricting.  Both the Ohio Senate and Ohio House of Representatives were retained by the Ohio Republican Party.

Party summary
Resignations and new members are discussed in the "Changes in membership" section, below.

Senate

House of Representatives

Leadership

Senate
Senate President: Keith Faber
President Pro Tempore: Chris Widener
Majority (Republican) leadership 
Majority Floor Leader: Tom Patton
Majority Whip: Larry Obhof
Minority (Democratic) leadership
Senate Minority Leader: Eric Kearney
Assistant Minority Leader: Joe Schiavoni
Minority Whip: Nina Turner
Assistant Minority Whip: Edna Brown

House of Representatives
Speaker of the House: William G. Batchelder
Speaker Pro Tempore: Matt Huffman
Majority (Republican) leadership 
Majority Floor Leader: Barbara Sears
Assistant Majority Floor Leader: John Adams
Majority Whip: Cheryl Grossman
Assistant Majority Whip: Jim Buchy
Minority (Democratic) leadership
 House Minority Leader: Armond Budish
Assistant Minority Leader: Matt Szollosi
Minority Whip: Tracy Maxwell Heard
Assistant Minority Whip: Debbie Phillips

Membership

Senate

House of Representatives

Changes in membership

Senate

House of Representatives

Committees
Listed alphabetically by chamber, including Chairperson and Ranking Member.

Senate
Source: "State of Ohio 130th General Assembly Senate Standing Committees" (January 2014)

Agriculture— Chair: Cliff Hite, Ranking: Lou Gentile
Civil Justice— Chair: Bill Coley, Ranking: Michael J. Skindell
Commerce and Labor— Chair: Kevin Bacon, Ranking: Edna Brown
Criminal Justice— Chair: John Eklund, Ranking: Eric Kearney
Education— Chair: Peggy Lehner, Ranking: Tom Sawyer
Energy and Natural Resources— Chair: Troy Balderson, Ranking: Lou Gentile
Finance— Chair: Scott Oelslager, Ranking: Tom Sawyer
Education— Chair: Randy Gardner, Ranking: Nina Turner
General Government— Chair: Bob Peterson, Ranking: Eric Kearney
Medicaid— Chair: David Burke, Ranking: Capri Cafaro
Insurance and Financial Institutions— Chair: Jim Hughes, Ranking: Nina Turner

Medicaid, Health and Human Services— Chair: Shannon Jones, Ranking: Capri Cafaro
Public Safety, Local Government and Veterans Affairs— Chair: Frank LaRose, Ranking: Michael J. Skindell
Public Utilities— Chair: Bill Seitz, Ranking: Eric Kearney
Reference— Chair: Kris Jordan, Ranking: Joe Schiavoni
Rules— Chair: Keith Faber, Ranking: Joe Schiavoni
State Government Oversight and Reform— Chair: David Burke, Ranking: Shirley Smith
Transportation— Chair: Gayle Manning, Ranking: Capri Cafaro
Ways and Means— Chair: Tim Schaffer, Ranking: Charleta Tavares
Tax Reform— Chair: Bob Peterson, Ranking: Charleta Tavares
Workforce and Economic Development— Chair: Bill Beagle, Ranking: Charleta Tavares

House of Representatives
Source: "Standing Committees Of The Ohio House Of Representatives 130th General Assembly" (August 2014)

Agriculture and Natural Resources— Chair: Dave Hall, Ranking: Jack Cera
Commerce, Labor, and Technology— Chair: Ron Young, Ranking: Bob Hagan
Economic Development and Regulatory Reform— Chair: Nan Baker, Ranking: Denise Driehaus
Education— Chair: Gerald Stebelton, Ranking: Teresa Fedor
Finance and Appropriations— Chair: Ron Amstutz, Ranking: Vernon Sykes
Agriculture and Development— Chair: Timothy Derickson, Ranking: Michael Ashford
Health and Human Services— Chair: Anne Gonzales, Ranking: Michael Foley
Higher Education— Chair: Cliff Rosenberger, Ranking: Dan Ramos
Primary and Secondary Education— Chair: Bill Hayes, Ranking: Matt Lundy
Transportation— Chair: Ross McGregor, Ranking: Alicia Reece
Financial Institutions, Housing, and Urban Development— Chair: Richard Adams, Ranking: Kevin Boyce
Health and Aging— Chair: Lynn Wachtmann, Ranking: Nickie Antonio
Opiate Addiction Treatment and Reform— Chair: vacant, Ranking: vacant

Higher Education Reform Study Committee— Chair: Cliff Rosenberger, Ranking: Dan Ramos
Insurance— Chair: Bob Hackett, Ranking: John Patrick Carney
Judiciary— Chair: Jim Butler, Ranking: Michael Stinziano
Manufacturing and Workforce Development— Chair: Kirk Schuring, Ranking: Roland Winburn
Military and Veterans Affairs— Chair: Terry Johnson, Ranking: Connie Pillich
Policy and Legislative Oversight— Chair: Mike Dovilla, Ranking: Ron Gerberry
Public Utilities— Chair: Peter Stautberg, Ranking: Sandra Williams
Rules and Reference— Chair: Matt Huffman, Ranking: Tracy Maxwell Heard
State and Local Government— Chair: vacant, Ranking: Kathleen Clyde
Shared Services and Government Efficiency— Chair: Ron Maag, Ranking: Stephen Slesnick
Transportation, Public Safety, and Homeland Security— Chair: Rex Damschroder, Ranking: Dale Mallory
Unemployment Compensation Debt Study Committee— Chair: Barbara Sears, Ranking: vacant
Ways and Means— Chair: Jeffrey McClain, Ranking: Tom Letson

Joint committees

Correctional Institution Inspection Committee— Chair: Sen. Shirley Smith (D)
Joint Committee on Agency Rule Review— Chair: Sen. Bob Peterson (R), Vice-Chair: Rep. Ross McGregor (R)
Joint Legislative Ethics Committee— Chair: Sen. Keith Faber (R), Vice-Chair: Rep. William G. Batchelder (R)

Legislative Service Commission— Chair: Sen. Keith Faber (R), Vice-Chair: Rep. William G. Batchelder (R)
State Controlling Board

Administrative officers

Senate
Chief of Staff: Jason Mauk
Minority Chief of Staff: Ernie Davis
Senate Clerk: Vincent Keeran
Sergeant-at-Arms: Ken Mumper

House of Representatives
Chief of Staff: Chad Hawley
Chief Administrative Officer: Kim Flasher
Minority Chief of Staff: Keary McCarthy
Clerk of the House of Representatives: Brad Young
Sergeant-at-Arms: Richard Collins

See also
 List of Ohio state legislatures

References

External links
130th Ohio General Assembly  official website
Ohio Senate official website
Ohio House of Representatives official website

Membership list and district maps
State House of Ohio at Project Vote Smart
Map of Ohio Senate Districts, 2012-2022
Map of Ohio House Districts, 2012-2022

Ohio legislative sessions
2013 in Ohio
2014 in Ohio
Ohio
Ohio

de:Repräsentantenhaus von Ohio